This is a list of institutions in the United Kingdom by the number of students enrolled in higher education courses. The student numbers include full-time and part-time, and are broken down into undergraduate and postgraduate students. Some institutes enrol students in both higher education and further education courses, so student numbers may be higher for such institutes. Numbers are of actual enrollments, not FTEs. The data show that 2.28 million people were enrolled in higher education at the  higher education providers reporting statistics to HESA.

Statistics are for students within the UK only and do not include distance-learning and transnational education students studying overseas. There were 666,815 overseas students recorded by HESA in 2018/19, of which 260,155 were registered at Oxford Brookes University, the majority of whom were studying on Association of Chartered Certified Accountants courses. Other universities with over 10,000 overseas students in 2018/19 were the University of London Worldwide (40,675), the Open University (29,610), Coventry (16,785), Nottingham (15,740),  Liverpool (14,730), Heriot-Watt (11,955), Staffordshire (11,900) and Middlesex (11,890).

Universities and other higher education providers by size

See also 
 Armorial of UK universities
 List of largest universities by enrollment
 List of universities in the United Kingdom
 List of UK universities by date of foundation
 List of UK universities by endowment

Notes

References

Higher education data
Enrollment
Statistics of education